Andalucía was a cycling team based in Spain; the team was managed by Antonio Cabello, and assisted by Juan Martínez as a directeur sportif. The team currently does not hold a requisite licence to compete in professional cycle racing, after the team were rejected a Professional Continental licence – where the team had competed at since 2006 – in December 2012.

The team looked to have a secure future, after the Andalusian government guaranteed sponsorship until 2010. However, they folded after the 2012 season.

2012 roster

Major wins

2005
 Circuito de Getxo, David Fernández
 Stages 1 & 3 Vuelta a Burgos, Carlos Castaño
2006
 Stage 1 Vuelta a Andalucía, Adolfo Garcia Quesada
 Stage 1 Vuelta a Castilla y Léon, Ángel Edo
 Stage 3 Vuelta a La Rioja, Manuel Vazquez
 Stage 2 Volta a Catalunya, Luis Pérez Romero
 GP Llodio, Jaume Rovira
 Overall Vuelta a Chihuahua, Luis Pérez Romero
Stages 1 & 3, Luis Pérez Romero
2007
 Overall Volta ao Alentejo, Manuel Vazquez
Stage 1, Manuel Vazquez
 Overall Clasica Alcobendas, Luis Pérez Rodríguez
Stage 1, Luis Pérez Rodríguez
 Stage 18 Vuelta a España, Luis Pérez Rodríguez
2008
 Stage 1 Vuelta a Andalucía, José Antonio López
 Stage 3 Vuelta a Castilla y Léon, Francisco Ventoso
 Stage 1 Vuelta a La Rioja, Francisco Ventoso
 Stage 7 Volta a Catalunya, José Luis Carrasco
2009
 Stage 5 Tour de San Luis, Xavier Tondo
 Prologue Vuelta a Andalucía, Xavier Tondo
 Stage 5 Vuelta a Asturias, Ángel Vicioso
 Stage 5 Volta a Portugal, Antonio Piedra
2010
 GP Llodio, Ángel Vicioso
 Vuelta a La Rioja, Ángel Vicioso
 Stage 2 Vuelta a Asturias, Ángel Vicioso
2011
 Stage 5a Rutas de America, Jesús Rosendo
 Circuito de Getxo, Juan José Lobato
 Stage 4a Volta a Portugal, José Vicente Toribio
2012
 Stages 2 & 10 Vuelta de Chile, Juan José Lobato
 Stage 5b Vuelta de Chile, Adrián Palomares
 Stage 7 Vuelta de Chile, Javier Ramírez
 Stage 1 Vuelta a Andalucía, Javier Ramírez
 Overall Azerbaijan Tour, Javier Ramírez
Stage 1, Javier Ramírez
Stage 5, Javier Chacón
 Stage 5 Tour of Qinghai Lake, Juan José Lobato

References

External links
 Official Site 

Cycling teams established in 2005
Defunct cycling teams based in Spain
Former UCI Professional Continental teams